The 1911 South Sydney Rabbitohs season was the 4th in the club's history. The club competed in the New South Wales Rugby Football League Premiership (NSWRFL), finishing the season 3rd. The top two teams were to play each other for the grand final, however South Sydney and Eastern Suburbs both finished second on the ladder with 20 points. An addition playoff game was put in place to decide who would play Glebe in the final. Souths lost 23-10.

Ladder

Fixtures

Regular season

Finals 
Eastern Suburbs  23 (Tries: Dally Messenger 2, Eddie White; Goals: Dally Messenger 7)

defeated

South Sydney 10 (Tries: Eddie Hilliard, Arthur McCabe; Goals: Wally Dymant 2)

References

South Sydney Rabbitohs seasons
1911 in Australian rugby league